The Resolution Party was one of the two political groups of the National Assembly of 1861 in Hungary. The group was led by Count László Teleki.

References
 Závodszky, Géza: Történelem III. Budapest, 2002.

Defunct political parties in Hungary
1861 establishments in the Austrian Empire
Radical parties
Liberal parties in Hungary